Belle's Tales of Friendship is a 1999 American live action/animated fantasy film. It was produced by Walt Disney Television Animation as a prequel to Beauty and the Beast: The Enchanted Christmas. It was also released to help promote the syndicated television series, Sing Me a Story with Belle, for which a live-action Belle tells stories from Disney cartoons such as The Wise Little Hen, The Three Little Pigs, Morris the Midget Moose and Hansel and Gretel with Belle narrating. The film stars Lynsey McLeod who continues portraying Belle in live-action form.

It also stars Paige O'Hara, Robby Benson, David Ogden Stiers, and Jerry Orbach who reprise their roles as Belle, Beast, Cogsworth, and Lumiere, respectively, in the animated form, in the short film, Mrs. Potts' Party. The film was released on August 17, 1999.

Synopsis

Belle's narration
Belle owns and works at her music and bookstore in France. A group of children walk into the store eager to hear Belle's stories, as she is noted to be a great storyteller. Belle agrees to tell a story, but the gang also play games and learn some simple lessons about life. Belle narrates two Disney cartoons, Morris the Midget Moose and Hansel and Gretel, while the children help Belle clean the bookstore. She also reads The Wise Little Hen and The Three Little Pigs, but Shawn and Harmony will not help make chili for the group. Along the way, Belle adds music and interacts with the children.

Mrs. Potts' Party (February 3, 1999)
Mrs. Potts is feeling depressed due to dreadful weather, and Belle decides to cheer her up by throwing a surprise for Mrs. Potts' birthday party for her. Belle has come to look at Mrs. Potts as a mother figure by this point. During preparations for the party, Belle and her friends have to avoid waking up the sleeping Beast. Beast spent the entire previous night fixing a leak in the roof and needs his sleep. However, Lumiere and Cogsworth's rivalry gets in the way. The two argue and compete over the tasks of composing music, choosing Mrs. Potts' favorite flowers, and choosing the flavors of the cake that will be served at the party. Two oven mits, Chaude (the red mit) and Tres (the blue mit), also take part in the argument, as they each side with one of the rivals.

Eventually, Lumiere and Cogsworth's attempt to sabotage one another's decisions has consequences. The baking cake explodes and makes a complete mess in the kitchen. Lumiere and Cogsworth, after a scolding from Belle, decide to put their rivalry behind them for good and work together to make a small surprise for Mrs. Potts. The plan goes well, and Mrs. Potts is cured of her depression, and the sun finally shines again. Everyone learns the power of cooperation and compromises with Mrs. Potts' birthday, singed by the song A Little Thought.

Cast

Live-action
 Lynsey McLeod - Belle
 Shawn Pyfrom - Shawn
 Kirsten Storms - Kirsten
 Natalie Trott - Natalie
 Hampton Dixon - Hampton
 Jennefer Jesse - Jennefer
 Julie Vanlue - Julie
 Jim Cummings - Lewis (voice)
 Christine Cavanaugh - Carroll (voice)

Animated
 Paige O'Hara - Belle
 Robby Benson - The Beast
 David Ogden Stiers - Cogsworth
 Jerry Orbach - Lumiere
 Gregory Grudt - Chip
 Anne Rogers - Mrs. Potts
 Jo Anne Worley - Armoire the Wardrobe
 Frank Welker - Sultan the Footstool
 Jim Cummings - Webster, Chef Bouche, Tubaloo, Big Book
 Jeff Bennett - Crane, Frappe
 Rob Paulsen - LePlume, Tres
 April Winchell - Chandeleria, Chaude, Concertina
 Jeff Conover - Harmony

External links

References

1999 films
1999 animated films
1999 direct-to-video films
1990s American animated films
American children's films
American films with live action and animation
American sequel films
Direct-to-video sequel films
Beauty and the Beast (franchise)
Disney direct-to-video animated films
Films about princes
Films set in France
Films set in castles
1990s English-language films